Lindsey VanZandt (born August 6, 1993) is an American mixed martial artist, currently fighting in the atomweight division of Invicta FC.

Mixed martial arts career

Early career
VanZandt made her professional debut against Katie Saull at KOTC - Regulator. She won the fight by a second-round technical knockout. VanZandt was next scheduled to fight Rachel Sazoff at Maverick MMA 3. She once again won the fight by a second-round technical knockout. VanZandt returned to KOTC for her third professional fight, being scheduled to fight Bi Nguyen at KOTC - Locked In. She won the fight by split decision.

Invicta FC
Her 3-0 record earned VanZandt the notice of Invicta FC. She was scheduled to make her debut with the organization against Kelly D'Angelo at Invicta FC 31 - Jandiroba vs. Morandin. D'Angelo won the fight by unanimous decision.

VanZandt rebounded from her first professional loss with a second-round TKO victory against Melissa Karagianis at KOTC - New Frontier. She was then scheduled to fight Tabatha Ann Watkins at Bellator 222. VanZandt won her promotional debut with Bellator by a second-round technical knockout.

VanZandt was scheduled to fight Rena Kubota at Bellator 222. She won the fight by a first-round rear-naked choke.

VanZandt was scheduled to fight Jéssica Delboni at Invicta FC 36 - Sorenson vs. Young. Delboni won the fight by split decision.

VanZandt was scheduled to fight Shino VanHoose at Invicta FC 37: Gonzalez vs. Sanchez. VanZandt won the fight by a first-round technical knockout.

VanZandt was scheduled to fight a rematch with Rena Kubota at Rizin 20. Kubota won the fight by a third-round technical knockout.

VanZandt was scheduled to fight Alesha Zappitella at Invicta FC 40: Ducote vs. Lima. Zappitella won the fight by split decision (28-29, 29-27, 30-27). The majority of media members scored the fight for Zappitella.

VanZandt took part in the Invicta FC Phoenix Tournament, which was held to determine the next atomweight title challenger. She earned her place in the finals with decision wins against Katie Perez and Linda Mihalec. VanZandt lost the final bout against Jéssica Delboni by unanimous decision.

VanZandt faced Jillian DeCoursey on May 11, 2022 at Invicta FC 47. She lost the bout after getting knocked out in the first round.

Mixed martial arts record

Professional

|-
|Loss
|align=center|7–6
|Jillian DeCoursey
|KO (punch)
|Invicta FC 47: Ducote vs. Zappitella
|
|align=center|1
|align=center|1:01
|Kansas City, Kansas, United States
|
|-
|Loss
|align=center|7–5
|Jéssica Delboni
|Decision (unanimous)
|Invicta FC Phoenix Tournament: Atomweight
|
|align=center|3
|align=center|5:00
|Kansas City, Kansas
|
|-
|Loss
|align=center|7–4
|Alesha Zappitella
|Decision (split)
|Invicta FC 40 - Ducote vs. Lima
|
|align=center|3
|align=center|5:00
|Kansas City, Kansas
|
|-
|Loss
|align=center|7–3
|Rena Kubota	
|TKO (corner stoppage)
|Rizin 20
|
|align=center|3
|align=center|4:42
|Saitama, Japan
|Catchweight bout 112 lbs (50.8 kg)
|-
|Win
|align=center|7–2
|Shino VanHoose
|TKO (leg kick)
|Invicta FC 37: Gonzalez vs. Sanchez
|
|align=center|1
|align=center|0:39
|Kansas City, Kansas
|
|-
|Loss
|align=center|6–2
|Jéssica Delboni
|Decision (split)
|Invicta FC 36 - Sorenson vs. Young
|
|align=center|3
|align=center|5:00
|Kansas City, Kansas
|
|-
|Win
|align=center|6–1
|Rena Kubota	
|Technical Submission (rear-naked choke)
|Bellator 222
|
|align=center|1
|align=center|4:04
|New York, New York
|Catchweight bout 112 lbs (50.8 kg)
|-
|Win
|align=center|5–1
|Tabatha Ann Watkins
|TKO (punches)
|Bellator 215
|
|align=center|2
|align=center|3:25
|Uncasville, Connecticut
|
|-
|Win
|align=center|4–1
|Melissa Karagianis
|TKO (punches)
|KOTC - New Frontier
|
|align=center|2
|align=center|1:54
|Hanover, Maryland
|
|-
|Loss
|align=center|3-1
|Kelly D'Angelo	
|Decision (unanimous)
|Invicta FC 31 - Jandiroba vs. Morandin
|
|align=center|3
|align=center|5:00
|Kansas City, Missouri
|
|-
|Win
|align=center|3–0
|Bi Nguyen
|Decision (split)
|KOTC - Locked In
|
|align=center|3
|align=center|5:00
|Philadelphia, Pennsylvania
|
|-
|Win
|align=center|2–0
|Rachel Sazoff
|TKO (punches)
|Maverick MMA 3 - Heckman vs. Sullivan 2
|
|align=center|2
|align=center|4:42
|Stroudsburg, Pennsylvania
|
|-
|Win
|align=center|1–0
|Katie Saull
|TKO (punches)
|KOTC - Regulator
|
|align=center|2
|align=center|1:25
|Philadelphia, Pennsylvania
|
|-

Amateur

|Loss
|align=center|3–3
|Jillian DeCoursey
|Decision (unanimous)
|KTFO & ACC - Worlds Collide
|
|align=center|3
|align=center|3:00
|Westbury, New York
|
|-
|Win
|align=center|3–2
|Jessica Branco	
|Submission (triangle choke)
|XFN 10 - Xtreme Fighting Nation 10: Tournament of Titans
|
|align=center|1
|align=center|2:50
|Fort Lauderdale, Florida
|
|-
|Loss
|align=center|2–2
|Gillian Robertson
|Decision (unanimous)
|CN 52 - Combat Night 52
|
|align=center|3
|align=center|3:00
|Jacksonville, Florida
|
|-
|Loss
|align=center|2–1
|Caitlin Sammons
|Submission (armbar)
|Breakthrough MMA 17 - Champions Emerge
|
|align=center|3
|align=center|1:39
|Kansas City, Kansas
|
|-
|Win
|align=center|2-0
|Shawna Lee Ormsby	
|Submission (armbar)
|CN 47 - Combat Night 47
|
|align=center|2
|align=center|N/A
|Jacksonville, Florida
|
|-
|Win
|align=center|1-0
|Laura Johnson
|Submission (armbar)
|CN 27 - Combat Night 27
|
|align=center|2
|align=center|N/A
|Jacksonville, Florida
|
|-

See also
 List of female mixed martial artists
 List of current Invicta FC fighters

References

External links
 
 Lindsey VanZandt at Invicta FC

1993 births
Living people
Atomweight mixed martial artists
American female mixed martial artists
Mixed martial artists utilizing taekwondo
Mixed martial artists utilizing Brazilian jiu-jitsu
Sportspeople from New York City
American female taekwondo practitioners
University of North Florida alumni
American practitioners of Brazilian jiu-jitsu
Female Brazilian jiu-jitsu practitioners
21st-century American women